Shouguang is a county-level city in the north-central part of Shandong Province, China, situated on the southwest shore of Laizhou Bay. Under the administration of the prefecture-level city of Weifang, it has  people residing within the municipality and its surrounding towns and villages as of the 2010 Census, even though the built-up (or metro) area is much smaller.

Administrative divisions
As 2012, this city is divided to 5 subdistricts and 9 towns.
Subdistricts

Towns

Climate

Economy
Shouguang is a major hub for vegetables and produce in China.And it also a major hub for chemical product.

Sports

The Shouguang Chengtou Stadium is located in Shouguang. The 25,000-capacity stadium is used mostly for association football matches and also sometimes for athletics.

Gallery

References

External links

Cities in Shandong
Weifang